is a Japanese video game developer based in Gifu. It was founded in July 2010 by former Flight-Plan employees. In April 2015, Felistella and Idea Factory have entered a capital tie-up agreement, in which Idea Factory acquired a portion of Felistella's stock.

Games

References

External links
 Felistella website 

Video game companies of Japan
Video game development companies
Companies based in Gifu Prefecture
Video game companies established in 2010
Japanese companies established in 2010